Nobutsuna (written: 信綱) is a masculine Japanese given name. Notable people with the name include:

, Japanese samurai
 (1596–1662), Japanese daimyō
 (1537–1575), Japanese samurai
 (1872–1963), Japanese poet

Japanese masculine given names